Benny Engelbrecht (born 4 August 1970) is a Danish politician who has been a member of the Folketing for the Social Democrats since the 2007 general elections. He served as the Minister of Transport from 2019 to 2022. He previously served as Minister of Taxation from 2014 to 2015. 

Engelbrecht was born on Amager to Alf Sørensen and Ulla Sørensen, and is married to Charlotte Engelbrecht.

Political career
Engelbrecht was first elected into the Folketing for the Social Democrats in 2007. He was reelected in the 2011 election, after which election the Social Democrats entered a coalition government with the Socialist People's Party and Social Liberal Party, with the Socialist People's Party later leaving government. When Morten Østergaard, Minister of Taxation in the Thorning-Schmidt II Cabinet, left the office to become Minister of Interior and Economy, Engelbrecht was appointed to take over as Minister of Taxation.

Engelbrecht was reelected in 2015 and 2019. He was appointed Minister for Transport in the Frederiksen Cabinet from 27 June 2019.

He resigned in February 2022, after failing to disclose information to the Folketing regarding a major infrastructure bill that was passed in July 2021. This led Mette Frederiksen to conduct a cabinet reshuffle in the wake of his resignation on 4 February.

Bibliography
De politiske håndværkere – om magt, indflydelse og resultater på Christiansborg (2017, co-author)
Rød bonde – et portræt af Erik Lauritzen (2013)
Foodfight.eu – din kost bestemmer, hvem du er. Men hvem bestemmer, hvad du spiser? (2011, co-author)

References

External links
 

1970 births
Living people
People from Amager
Danish Tax Ministers
Danish writers
Social Democrats (Denmark) politicians
Members of the Folketing 2007–2011
Members of the Folketing 2011–2015
Members of the Folketing 2015–2019
Members of the Folketing 2019–2022
Members of the Folketing 2022–2026
Transport ministers of Denmark